Keti may refer to:

People
 Keti Chkhikvadze, Georgian fashion designer
 Keti Chomata, Greek singer
 Keti Chukhrov
 Keti Davlianidze
 Keti Fetishi (born 1997), Albanian racing cyclist
 Keti Khitiri (born 1982), Georgian actress
 Keti Shitrit (born 1960), Israeli politician
 Keti Tenenblat (born 1944), Turkish-Brazilian mathematician
 Keti Topuria (born 1986)
 Keti Tsatsalashvili (born 1992), Georgian chess player
 Nafoitoa Talaimanu Keti, Samoan politician

Places
 Keti, Armenia
 Keti, Pakistan
 Keti Bandar, Pakistan

Other
 KETI-LP